Sérgio André Pereira Neves (born 6 July 1993 in Águas Santas), known as Serginho, is a Portuguese footballer who plays as a central defender for Gondomar.

References

1993 births
People from Maia, Portugal
Living people
Portuguese footballers
Association football defenders
Liga Portugal 2 players
Segunda Divisão players
Leixões S.C. players
Leça F.C. players
GD Bragança players
C.F. Os Belenenses players
Académico de Viseu F.C. players
Vitória S.C. B players
F.C. Felgueiras 1932 players
S.U. Sintrense players
Sportspeople from Porto District